Eduardo Bengoechea (born 2 July 1959) is an Argentine former tennis player born in Córdoba. He achieved a highest career ranking in singles of world No. 21 in September 1987. Bengoechea did not win a singles or doubles title on the ATP tour level but was twice a finalist in doubles. After his playing career he was captain of the Argentinian Davis Cup team in 1996.

Career finals

Doubles (2 losses)

External links
 
 
 

1959 births
Living people
Argentine male tennis players
Argentine people of Basque descent
Sportspeople from Córdoba, Argentina
20th-century Argentine people